Ilex costaricensis is a species of plant in the family Aquifoliaceae. It is found in Costa Rica, Nicaragua, and Panama. It is threatened by habitat loss.

References

Flora of Costa Rica
Flora of Nicaragua
Flora of Panama
costaricensis
Vulnerable plants
Taxonomy articles created by Polbot